The New Jersey Pride were a men's professional field lacrosse team in the Major League Lacrosse formerly based in Piscataway, New Jersey, United States from 2001-2008.

Franchise history
In 2001, the first year of the league’s existence, the Pride played its games at Yogi Berra Stadium at Montclair State University but TD Bank Park in Bridgewater Township, New Jersey in 2002 to 2003. For 2004 to 2005, the Pride played its home games on Sprague Field at Montclair State University. The Pride made the league's playoffs in 2002 and 2003.

For the 2006 season, the Pride moved to the 5,000 seat stadium on the campus of Rutgers University which houses the Scarlet Knights’ soccer and lacrosse teams and is officially named The Soccer/Lacrosse Stadium at Yurcak Field in honor of Ronald N. Yurcak, a 1965 All-American Rutgers lacrosse player.

The team suspended operations after the 2008 season.

Season-by-season

Former Stars
Jesse Hubbard. Princeton, 1998; 3-time NCAA National Champion, Princeton University with Jon Hess; Leading all-time scorer at Princeton; All NCAA Tournament Team, 1997 and 1998; All Ivy, 1997 and 1998. Hubbard was traded to the Los Angeles Riptide prior to the 2008 Season.
Scott Urick. Georgetown, 2000; 2-time NCAA All-American and Captain; Georgetown’s all-time Leading Scorer; Georgetown’s All-Time Single Season and Career Leader in ground balls; Played on four NCAA Tournament Teams; NCAA North-South All-Star, 2000.
Adam Doneger. Johns Hopkins, 2000-2003; two-time First Team All-American and co-captain; Scored a career-high 28 goals and seven assists in 2003; NCAA All-Tournament Team, 2002.
Kyle Harrison. Johns Hopkins, 2005; National Player-of-the-Year, 2005 Tewaaraton Trophy Winner; 2005 National Champion and 1st overall selection in the 2005 College Draft.  Harrison was also traded to the Los Angeles Riptide for the 2008 season.
Matt Danowski. Duke, 2008; Tewaaraton Trophy Winner 2007; Acquired Second in the lacrosse draft.  Took option of an extra year at Duke.  Was expected to go first 2007

Award winners
 4-time All-Star Jesse Hubbard
 2-time All-Star Scott Urick
 3-time All-Star Jay Jalbert
 3-time All-Star David Curry
 1-time All-Star Jon Hess
 2003 Rookie of the Year and All-Star Adam Doneger
 2005 Community Service Award Winner Ryan McClay
 2006 All-MLL Team Andy Corno

Coaches and others
 Ted Georgalas 2001-05     (24-35)
 Brian Silcott  2005     (1-4)
 Peter Jacobs  2006-     (15-21)
 Charlie Shoulberg 2001-2002 (General Manager)
 Bob Turco 2003-2004 (General Manager)
 Trey Reeder 2005-2007 (General Manager)
 Steve Ferretti 2002-2008 (Assistant General Manager, General Manager
 Robert Brown 2005-2008 (President)

External links
 New Jersey Pride Official Website

Defunct Major League Lacrosse teams
Lacrosse clubs established in 2001
Sports clubs disestablished in 2008
Defunct sports teams in New Jersey
Lacrosse teams in New Jersey
Sports teams in the New York metropolitan area
2001 establishments in New Jersey
2008 disestablishments in New Jersey